KF Bashkimi may refer to one of two football clubs based in Kumanovo, North Macedonia:

KF Bashkimi (1947–2008), dissolved due to financial difficulties
FK Bashkimi, founded 2011